The 1941 Bowling Green Falcons football team was an American football team that represented Bowling Green State University as a member of the Ohio Athletic Conference (OAC) during the 1941 college football season. In its first season under head coach Robert Whittaker, the team compiled a 7–1–1 record and outscored opponents by a total of 173 to 40.  Edward Wellner was the team captain. The team played its home games at University Stadium in Bowling Green, Ohio.

Schedule

References

Bowling Green
Bowling Green Falcons football seasons
Bowling Green Falcons football